Veliki Dol is a settlement in the hills north of Krško in eastern Slovenia. The area is part of the traditional region of Styria. It is now included in the Lower Sava Statistical Region.

References

External links
Veliki Dol on Geopedia

Populated places in the Municipality of Krško